The 2015–16 División de Honor B, the XVIII edition since its inception in 1998, began on September 19, 2015 with the first matchday of regular season and will run through 29 May with the Promotion playoffs Final. For 2015–16 season, championship comprises 3 groups of 12 teams each.

Competition format
The season comprises Main stage or regular season and Promotion playoff. The regular season runs through 22 matchdays. Upon completion the regular season, the two top teams of each group and two-best 3rd placed teams qualify for promotion playoff. 

Points during regular season are awarded as following;

Each win means 4 points to winning team.
A draw means 2 points for each team.
1 bonus point for a team that achieves 4 tries in a match.
A defeat by 7 or less points means 1 bonus point for defeated team.

Teams

Group A
Teams from northern section of Spain

Group B
Teams from eastern part of Spain

Group C
Teams from southern section of Spain

Regular season standings

Group A

Group B

Group C

CR Atlético Portuense initially qualified for promotion playoff, but later declined to take part.

Promotion playoff

Qualified teams
To determine pairings, teams qualified are sorted by total points.

According to competition rules, pairings are based as follows:

Calendar

Quarter finals

|}
CR La Vila, disqualified for fielding an ineligible player. CAU Valencia advanced to next round.

Semifinals

|}

Matches

1st leg

2nd leg

Final

|}

1st leg

2nd leg

CAU Valencia play the relegation/promotion playoff against Bizkaia Gernika.

Scorers statistics

Top try scorers

Top points scorers

See also
2015–16 División de Honor de Rugby

References

External links
Federación Española de Rugby

2015–16
B